Angela Menardi (born  in Pieve di Cadore) is an Italian wheelchair curler and paralympic cross-country skier.

As a wheelchair curler she participated in the 2010 Winter Paralympics where Italian team finished on fifth place.

As a cross-country skier she participated in the 1992 Winter Paralympics at women's cross-country short distance 2.5 km LW10-11 and long distance 5 km LW10-11; she finished on seventh place both times.

Teams

References

External links 

Angela Menardi | Sky Sport
Player profile - FISG - Federazione Italiana Sport del Ghiaccio (Italian Ice Sports Federation)
Profile at the Official Website for the 2010 Winter Paralympics in Vancouver

Living people
1964 births
Sportspeople from the Province of Belluno
Italian disabled sportspeople
Italian female curlers
Italian wheelchair curlers
Paralympic wheelchair curlers of Italy
Wheelchair curlers at the 2010 Winter Paralympics
Italian female cross-country skiers
Paralympic cross-country skiers of Italy
Cross-country skiers at the 1992 Winter Paralympics